Danyor Rock Inscriptions is an archaeological site in Danyor, Gilgit-Baltistan. It is a gigantic boulder bearing inscriptions from the 7th and 8th centuries A.D.

Location
The site is located on the left bank of the Gilgit River along the Karakoram Highway in Danyor.

Protection
The site is protected under the Pakistan Antiquities Act.

References

Archaeological sites in Gilgit-Baltistan
History of Gilgit-Baltistan
Monuments and memorials in Gilgit-Baltistan
Buildings and structures in Gilgit-Baltistan